This is a list of Swedish politicians.

12th century 
Earl Birger Brosa (1174–1202)
Folke the Fat

13th century 
Earl Birger (1210–1266)

14th century 
Saint Bridget of Sweden (1303–1373)

15th century 
Karl Knutsson Bonde (1409–1470)
Engelbrekt Engelbrektsson (~1390–1436)
Sten Sture the Elder (1440–1503)

16th century 
Christina Gyllenstierna (1494–1559)
Gustav Vasa (1496–1560)
Svante Nilsson Sture (1460–1512)
Jöran Persson (1530–1568)
Sten Sture the Younger (1492–1520)

17th century 
Gustav Bonde (1620–1667)
Per Brahe (1602–1680)
Magnus Gabriel De la Gardie (1622–1686)
Axel Oxenstierna (1583–1654)
Bengt Oxenstierna (1623–1702)
Gabriel Oxenstierna (1587–1640)
Johan Oxenstierna (1611–1657)
Johann Patkul (1660–1707)
Anders Torstenson (1641–1686)

18th century 
Axel von Fersen, Sr. (1755–1810)
Arvid Horn (1664–1742)
Gustaf Adolf Reuterholm (1756–1813)
Göran Magnus Sprengtporten (1740–1819)
Jacob Magnus Sprengtporten (1727–1786)

19th century 
Nils Magnus Brahe (1790–1844)
Axel von Fersen, Jr. (1755–1810)
Louis De Geer (1818–1896)
Carl Gustaf Nordin (1749–1812)
Johan Gabriel Richert (1784–1864)

20th century
Sven Aspling (1912–2000) 
Leif Bergdahl (born 1941)
Leif Blomberg (1941–1998)
Thorwald Bergquist (1899–1972)
Carl Bildt (born 1949)
Gösta Bohman (1911–1997)
Anitha Bondestam (born 1941)
Ingvar Carlsson (born 1934)
Reidar Carlsson (born 1957)
Birgitta Dahl (born 1937)
Jerzy Einhorn (1925–2000)
Birger Ekstedt (1921–1972)
Tage Erlander (1901–1985)
Johan Friggeråker (1872–1959)
Thorbjörn Fälldin (1926–2016)
Hans Gustafsson (1923–1998)
Sture Henriksson (1917–1957) 
Sven Hulterström (born 1938) 
Kjell Larsson (1943–2002) 
Henning Leo (1885–1953) 
Torsten Nilsson (1905–1997) 
Bengt Norling (1925–2002) 
Olof Palme (1927–1986)
Ove Rainer (1925–1987)
Gösta Skoglund (1903–1988)
Arvid Taube (1853–1916) 
Ola Ullsten (1931–2018)
Lars Werner (1935–2013)

21st century 
Jan Björklund
Inger Davidson
Peter Eriksson
Rickard Falkvinge
Laila Freivalds (born 1942) - former Minister for Foreign Affairs
Göran Hägglund
Bo Holmberg
Lars Leijonborg
Anna Lindh (1957–2003) - Minister for Foreign Affairs (1998-2003); assassinated in 2003
Bo Lundgren (born 1947)
Mats Odell
Maud Olofsson
Marit Paulsen
Göran Persson (born 1949)
Fredrik Reinfeldt - former leader of the Moderate Party
Bosse Ringholm
Gudrun Schyman
Jonas Sjöstedt
Alf Svensson
Björn von Sydow
Per Westerberg - former speaker of the Parliament
Maria Wetterstrand
Stefan Löfven - Prime minister
Jimmie Åkesson
Ulf Kristersson
Annie Lööf
Nyamko Sabuni

See also 

County Governors of Sweden
Governor-General in the Swedish Realm
List of political parties in Sweden
List of Swedish monarchs
List of Swedish Ministers for Foreign Affairs
List of Swedish Prime Ministers
Oxenstierna, (1583–1654), Sture
Politics of Sweden
Viceroy of Norway

 
Swedish
Politicians